This is a list of notable heads of state and heads of government who have died from aviation accidents, usually while in office.

Heads of state

Heads of government

International organizations

References

Aviation accidents and incidents involving state leaders
Death
Death